Kije may refer to the following:

Lieutenant Kijé, a novella by Yury Tynyanov
Lieutenant Kijé (film), a 1934 Soviet film
Lieutenant Kijé, the film score and suite by Sergei Prokofiev
Porośl-Kije in Podlaskie Voivodeship (north-east Poland)
Kije, Pajęczno County in Łódź Voivodeship (central Poland)
Kije, Sieradz County in Łódź Voivodeship (central Poland)
Kije, Świętokrzyskie Voivodeship (south-central Poland)
Kije, Lubusz Voivodeship (west Poland)
Kije, Warmian-Masurian Voivodeship (north Poland)
Kije, West Pomeranian Voivodeship (north-west Poland)